Nuclear reprocessing is the chemical separation of fission products and actinides from spent nuclear fuel. Originally, reprocessing was used solely to extract plutonium for producing nuclear weapons. With commercialization of nuclear power, the reprocessed plutonium was recycled back into MOX nuclear fuel for thermal reactors. The reprocessed uranium, also known as the spent fuel material, can in principle also be re-used as fuel, but that is only economical when uranium supply is low and prices are high. A breeder reactor is not restricted to using recycled plutonium and uranium. It can employ all the actinides, closing the nuclear fuel cycle and potentially multiplying the energy extracted from natural uranium by about 60 times.

Reprocessing must be highly controlled and carefully executed in advanced facilities by highly specialized personnel. Fuel bundles which arrive at the sites from nuclear power plants (after having cooled down for several years) are completely dissolved in chemical baths, which could pose contamination risks if not properly managed.

Relatively high cost is associated with spent fuel reprocessing compared to the once-through fuel cycle, but fuel use can be increased and waste volumes decreased. Nuclear fuel reprocessing is performed routinely in Europe, Russia, and Japan. In the United States, the Obama administration stepped back from President Bush's plans for commercial-scale reprocessing and reverted to a program focused on reprocessing-related scientific research.

Separated components and disposition 

The potentially useful components dealt with in nuclear reprocessing comprise specific actinides (plutonium, uranium, and some minor actinides). The lighter elements components include fission products, activation products, and cladding.

History
The first large-scale nuclear reactors were built during World War II. These reactors were designed for the production of plutonium for use in nuclear weapons. The only reprocessing required, therefore, was the extraction of the plutonium (free of fission-product contamination) from the spent natural uranium fuel. In 1943, several methods were proposed for separating the relatively small quantity of plutonium from the uranium and fission products. The first method selected, a precipitation process called the bismuth phosphate process, was developed and tested at the Oak Ridge National Laboratory (ORNL) between 1943 and 1945 to produce quantities of plutonium for evaluation and use in the US weapons programs. ORNL produced the first macroscopic quantities (grams) of separated plutonium with these processes.

The bismuth phosphate process was first operated on a large scale at the Hanford Site, in the later part of 1944. It was successful for plutonium separation in the emergency situation existing then, but it had a significant weakness: the inability to recover uranium.

The first successful solvent extraction process for the recovery of pure uranium and plutonium was developed at ORNL in 1949. The PUREX process is the current method of extraction. Separation plants were also constructed at Savannah River Site and a smaller plant at West Valley Reprocessing Plant which closed by 1972 because of its inability to meet new regulatory requirements.

Reprocessing of civilian fuel has long been employed at the COGEMA La Hague site in France, the Sellafield site in the United Kingdom, the Mayak Chemical Combine in Russia, and at sites such as the Tokai plant in Japan, the Tarapur plant in India, and briefly at the West Valley Reprocessing Plant in the United States.

In October 1976, concern of nuclear weapons proliferation (especially after India demonstrated nuclear weapons capabilities using reprocessing technology) led President Gerald Ford to issue a Presidential directive to indefinitely suspend the commercial reprocessing and recycling of plutonium in the U.S. On 7 April 1977, President Jimmy Carter banned the reprocessing of commercial reactor spent nuclear fuel. The key issue driving this policy was the risk of nuclear weapons proliferation by diversion of plutonium from the civilian fuel cycle, and to encourage other nations to follow the US lead. After that, only countries that already had large investments in reprocessing infrastructure continued to reprocess spent nuclear fuel. President Reagan lifted the ban in 1981, but did not provide the substantial subsidy that would have been necessary to start up commercial reprocessing.

In March 1999, the U.S. Department of Energy (DOE) reversed its policy and signed a contract with a consortium of Duke Energy, COGEMA, and Stone & Webster (DCS) to design and operate a mixed oxide (MOX) fuel fabrication facility. Site preparation at the Savannah River Site (South Carolina) began in October 2005. In 2011 the New York Times reported "...11 years after the government awarded a construction contract, the cost of the project has soared to nearly $5 billion. The vast concrete and steel structure is a half-finished hulk, and the government has yet to find a single customer, despite offers of lucrative subsidies." TVA (currently the most likely customer) said in April 2011 that it would delay a decision until it could see how MOX fuel performed in the nuclear accident at Fukushima Daiichi.

Separation technologies

Water and organic solvents

PUREX

PUREX, the current standard method, is an acronym standing for Plutonium and Uranium Recovery by EXtraction. The PUREX process is a liquid-liquid extraction method used to reprocess spent nuclear fuel, to extract uranium and plutonium, independent of each other, from the fission products. This is the most developed and widely used process in the industry at present.

When used on fuel from commercial power reactors the plutonium extracted typically contains too much Pu-240 to be considered "weapons-grade" plutonium, ideal for use in a nuclear weapon. Nevertheless, highly reliable nuclear weapons can be built at all levels of technical sophistication using reactor-grade plutonium. Moreover, reactors that are capable of refueling frequently can be used to produce weapon-grade plutonium, which can later be recovered using PUREX. Because of this, PUREX chemicals are monitored.

Modifications of PUREX

UREX
The PUREX process can be modified to make a UREX (URanium EXtraction) process which could be used to save space inside high level nuclear waste disposal sites, such as the Yucca Mountain nuclear waste repository, by removing the uranium which makes up the vast majority of the mass and volume of used fuel and recycling it as reprocessed uranium.

The UREX process is a PUREX process which has been modified to prevent the plutonium from being extracted. This can be done by adding a plutonium reductant before the first metal extraction step. In the UREX process, ~99.9% of the uranium and >95% of technetium are separated from each other and the other fission products and actinides. The key is the addition of acetohydroxamic acid (AHA) to the extraction and scrub sections of the process. The addition of AHA greatly diminishes the extractability of plutonium and neptunium, providing somewhat greater proliferation resistance than with the plutonium extraction stage of the PUREX process.

TRUEX
Adding a second extraction agent, octyl(phenyl)-N, N-dibutyl carbamoylmethyl phosphine oxide (CMPO) in combination with tributylphosphate, (TBP), the PUREX process can be turned into the TRUEX (TRansUranic EXtraction) process. TRUEX was invented in the US by Argonne National Laboratory and is designed to remove the transuranic metals (Am/Cm) from waste. The idea is that by lowering the alpha activity of the waste, the majority of the waste can then be disposed of with greater ease. In common with PUREX this process operates by a solvation mechanism.

DIAMEX
As an alternative to TRUEX, an extraction process using a malondiamide has been devised. The DIAMEX (DIAMide EXtraction) process has the advantage of avoiding the formation of organic waste which contains elements other than carbon, hydrogen, nitrogen, and oxygen. Such an organic waste can be burned without the formation of acidic gases which could contribute to acid rain (although the acidic gases could be recovered by a scrubber). The DIAMEX process is being worked on in Europe by the French CEA. The process is sufficiently mature that an industrial plant could be constructed with the existing knowledge of the process. In common with PUREX this process operates by a solvation mechanism.

SANEX
Selective ActiNide EXtraction. As part of the management of minor actinides it has been proposed that the lanthanides and trivalent minor actinides should be removed from the PUREX raffinate by a process such as DIAMEX or TRUEX. To allow the actinides such as americium to be either reused in industrial sources or used as fuel, the lanthanides must be removed. The lanthanides have large neutron cross sections and hence they would poison a neutron driven nuclear reaction. To date the extraction system for the SANEX process has not been defined, but currently several different research groups are working towards a process. For instance the French CEA is working on a bis-triazinyl pyridine (BTP) based process.
Other systems such as the dithiophosphinic acids are being worked on by some other workers.

UNEX
The UNiversal EXtraction process was developed in Russia and the Czech Republic; it is designed to completely remove the most troublesome radioisotopes (Sr, Cs and minor actinides) from the raffinate remaining after the extraction of uranium and plutonium from used nuclear fuel. The chemistry is based upon the interaction of caesium and strontium with polyethylene glycol and a cobalt carborane anion (known as chlorinated cobalt dicarbollide). The actinides are extracted by CMPO, and the diluent is a polar aromatic such as nitrobenzene. Other diluents such as meta-nitrobenzotrifluoride and phenyl trifluoromethyl sulfone have been suggested as well.

Electrochemical and Ion Exchange methods 
An exotic method using electrochemistry and ion exchange in ammonium carbonate has been reported. Other methods for the extraction of uranium using ion exchange in alkaline carbonate and "fumed" lead oxide have also been reported.

Obsolete methods

Bismuth phosphate 
The bismuth phosphate process is an obsolete process that adds significant unnecessary material to the final radioactive waste. The bismuth phosphate process has been replaced by solvent extraction processes. The bismuth phosphate process was designed to extract plutonium from aluminium-clad nuclear fuel rods, containing uranium. The fuel was decladded by boiling it in caustic soda. After decladding, the uranium metal was dissolved in nitric acid.

The plutonium at this point is in the +4 oxidation state. It was then precipitated out of the solution by the addition of bismuth nitrate and phosphoric acid to form the bismuth phosphate. The plutonium was coprecipitated with this. The supernatant liquid (containing many of the fission products) was separated from the solid. The precipitate was then dissolved in nitric acid before the addition of an oxidant (such as potassium permanganate) to produce PuO22+. The plutonium was maintained in the +6 oxidation state by addition of a dichromate salt.

The bismuth phosphate was next re-precipitated, leaving the plutonium in solution, and an iron(II) salt (such as ferrous sulfate) was added. The plutonium was again re-precipitated using a bismuth phosphate carrier and a combination of lanthanum salts and fluoride added, forming a solid lanthanum fluoride carrier for the plutonium. Addition of an alkali produced an oxide. The combined lanthanum plutonium oxide was collected and extracted with nitric acid to form plutonium nitrate.

Hexone or REDOX 
This is a liquid-liquid extraction process which uses methyl isobutyl ketone codenamed hexone as the extractant. The extraction is by a solvation mechanism. This process has the disadvantage of requiring the use of a salting-out reagent (aluminium nitrate) to increase the nitrate concentration in the aqueous phase to obtain a reasonable distribution ratio (D value). Also, hexone is degraded by concentrated nitric acid. This process was used in 1952-1956 on the Hanford plant T and has been replaced by the PUREX process.

Butex, β,β'-dibutyoxydiethyl ether 
A process based on a solvation extraction process using the triether extractant named above. This process has the disadvantage of requiring the use of a salting-out reagent (aluminium nitrate) to increase the nitrate concentration in the aqueous phase to obtain a reasonable distribution ratio. This process was used at Windscale in 1951-1964. This process has been replaced by PUREX, which was shown to be a superior technology for larger scale reprocessing.

Sodium acetate 
The sodium uranyl acetate process was used by the early Soviet nuclear industry to recover plutonium from irradiated fuel. It was a never used in the West; the idea is to dissolve the fuel in nitric acid, alter the oxidation state of the plutonium, and then add acetic acid and base. This would convert the uranium and plutonium into a solid acetate salt.

Explosion of the crystallized acetates-nitrates in a non-cooled waste tank caused the Kyshtym disaster in 1957.

Alternatives to PUREX
As there are some downsides to the PUREX process, there have been efforts to develop alternatives to the process, some of them compatible with PUREX (i.e. the residue from one process could be used as feedstock for the other) and others wholly incompatible. None of these have (as of the 2020s) reached widespread commercial use, but some have seen large scale tests or firm commitments towards their future larger scale implementation.

Pyroprocessing 

Pyroprocessing is a generic term for high-temperature methods. Solvents are molten salts (e.g. LiCl + KCl or LiF + CaF2) and molten metals (e.g. cadmium, bismuth, magnesium) rather than water and organic compounds. Electrorefining, distillation, and solvent-solvent extraction are common steps.

These processes are not currently in significant use worldwide, but they have been pioneered at Argonne National Laboratory with current research also taking place at CRIEPI in Japan, the Nuclear Research Institute of Řež in Czech Republic, Indira Gandhi Centre for Atomic Research in India and KAERI in South Korea.

Advantages of pyroprocessing
 The principles behind it are well understood, and no significant technical barriers exist to their adoption.
 Readily applied to high-burnup spent fuel and requires little cooling time, since the operating temperatures are high already.
 Does not use solvents containing hydrogen and carbon, which are neutron moderators creating risk of criticality accidents and can absorb the fission product tritium and the activation product carbon-14 in dilute solutions that cannot be separated later.
Alternatively, voloxidation (see below) can remove 99% of the tritium from used fuel and recover it in the form of a strong solution suitable for use as a supply of tritium.
 More compact than aqueous methods, allowing on-site reprocessing at the reactor site, which avoids transportation of spent fuel and its security issues, instead storing a much smaller volume of fission products on site as high-level waste until decommissioning. For example, the Integral Fast Reactor and Molten Salt Reactor fuel cycles are based on on-site pyroprocessing.
 It can separate many or even all actinides at once and produce highly radioactive fuel which is harder to manipulate for theft or making nuclear weapons. (However, the difficulty has been questioned.) In contrast the PUREX process was designed to separate plutonium only for weapons, and it also leaves the minor actinides (americium and curium) behind, producing waste with more long-lived radioactivity.
 Most of the radioactivity in roughly 102 to 105 years after the use of the nuclear fuel is produced by the actinides, since there are no fission products with half-lives in this range. These actinides can fuel fast reactors, so extracting and reusing (fissioning) them increases energy production per kg of fuel, as well as reducing the long-term radioactivity of the wastes.
 Fluoride volatility (see below) produces salts that can readily be used in molten salt reprocessing such as pyroprocessing
 The ability to process "fresh" spent fuel reduces the needs for spent fuel pools (even if the recovered short lived radionuclides are "only" sent to storage, that still requires less space as the bulk of the mass - Uranium - can be stored separately from them). Uranium - even higher specific activity reprocessed uranium - does not need cooling for safe storage.
 Short lived radionuclides can be recovered from "fresh" spent fuel allowing either their direct use in industry science or medicine or the recovery of their decay products without contamination by other isotopes (for example: ruthenium in spent fuel decays to rhodium all isotopes of which other than  further decay to stable isotopes of palladium. Palladium derived from the decay of fission ruthenium and rhodium will be nonradioactive, but fission Palladium contains significant contamination with long-lived . Ru-107 and Rh-107 both have half lives in the minutes and will decay to Pd-107 before reprocessing under most circumstances)
 Possible fuels for radioisotope thermoelectric generators (RTGs) that are mostly decayed in spent fuel, that has significantly aged, can be recovered in sufficient quantities to make their use worthwhile. While those would perhaps not be suitable for lengthy space missions, they can be used to replace diesel generators in off-grid locations where refueling is possible once a year. Antimony would be particularly interesting because it forms a stable alloy with lead and can thus be transformed relatively easily into a partially self-shielding and chemically inert form. Shorter lived RTG fuels present the further benefit of reducing the risk of orphan sources as the activity will decline relatively quickly if no refueling is undertaken.

Disadvantages of pyroprocessing
 Reprocessing as a whole is not currently (2005) in favor, and places that do reprocess already have PUREX plants constructed. Consequently, there is little demand for new pyrometallurgical systems, although there could be if the Generation IV reactor programs become reality.
 The used salt from pyroprocessing is less suitable for conversion into glass than the waste materials produced by the PUREX process.
 If the goal is to reduce the longevity of spent nuclear fuel in burner reactors, then better recovery rates of the minor actinides need to be achieved.
 Working with "fresh" spent fuel requires more shielding and better ways to deal with heat production than working with "aged" spent fuel does. If the facilities are built in such a way as to require high specific activity material, they cannot handle older "legacy waste" except blended with fresh spent fuel

Electrolysis
The electrolysis methods are based on the difference in the standard potentials of uranium, plutonium and minor actinides in a molten salt. The standard potential of uranium is the lowest, therefore when a potential is applied, the uranium will be reduced at the cathode out of the molten salt solution before the other elements.

PYRO-A and -B for IFR
These processes were developed by Argonne National Laboratory and used in the Integral Fast Reactor project.

PYRO-A is a means of separating actinides (elements within the actinide family, generally heavier than U-235) from non-actinides. The spent fuel is placed in an anode basket which is immersed in a molten salt electrolyte. An electric current is applied, causing the uranium metal (or sometimes oxide, depending on the spent fuel) to plate out on a solid metal cathode while the other actinides (and the rare earths) can be absorbed into a liquid cadmium cathode. Many of the fission products (such as caesium, zirconium and strontium) remain in the salt. As alternatives to the molten cadmium electrode it is possible to use a molten bismuth cathode, or a solid aluminium cathode.

As an alternative to electrowinning, the wanted metal can be isolated by using a molten alloy of an electropositive metal and a less reactive metal.

Since the majority of the long term radioactivity, and volume, of spent fuel comes from actinides, removing the actinides produces waste that is more compact, and not nearly as dangerous over the long term. The radioactivity of this waste will then drop to the level of various naturally occurring minerals and ores within a few hundred, rather than thousands of, years.

The mixed actinides produced by pyrometallic processing can be used again as nuclear fuel, as they are virtually all either fissile, or fertile, though many of these materials would require a fast breeder reactor to be burned efficiently. In a thermal neutron spectrum, the concentrations of several heavy actinides (curium-242 and plutonium-240) can become quite high, creating fuel that is substantially different from the usual uranium or mixed uranium-plutonium oxides (MOX) that most current reactors were designed to use.

Another pyrochemical process, the PYRO-B process, has been developed for the processing and recycling of fuel from a transmuter reactor ( a fast breeder reactor designed to convert transuranic nuclear waste into fission products ). A typical transmuter fuel is free from uranium and contains recovered transuranics in an inert matrix such as metallic zirconium. In the PYRO-B processing of such fuel, an electrorefining step is used to separate the residual transuranic elements from the fission products and recycle the transuranics to the reactor for fissioning. Newly generated technetium and iodine are extracted for incorporation into transmutation targets, and the other fission products are sent to waste.

Voloxidation
Voloxidation (for volumetric oxidation) involves heating oxide fuel with oxygen, sometimes with alternating oxidation and reduction, or alternating oxidation by ozone to uranium trioxide with decomposition by heating back to triuranium octoxide. A major purpose is to capture tritium as tritiated water vapor before further processing where it would be difficult to retain the tritium. Tritium is a difficult contaminant to remove from aqueous solution, as it cannot be separated from water except by isotope separation. However, tritium is also a valuable product used in industry science and nuclear weapons, so recovery of a stream of hydrogen or water with a high tritium content can make targeted recovery economically worthwhile. Other volatile elements leave the fuel and must be recovered, especially iodine, technetium, and carbon-14. Voloxidation also breaks up the fuel or increases its surface area to enhance penetration of reagents in following reprocessing steps.

Advantages 
 The process is simple and requires no complex machinery or chemicals above and beyond that required in all reprocessing (hot cells, remote handling equipment)
 Products such as Krypton-85 or Tritium as well as Xenon (whose isotope are either stable, very nearly stable, or quickly decay) can be recovered and sold for use in industry, science or medicine 
 Driving off volatile fission products allows for safer storage in interim storage or deep geological repository
 Nuclear proliferation risks are low as no separation of plutonium occurs
 Radioactive material is not chemically mobilized beyond what should be accounted for in long term storage anyway. Substances that are inert as native elements or oxides remain so
 The product can be used as fuel in a CANDU reactor or even downblended with similarly treated spent CANDU fuel if too much fissile material is left in the spent fuel.
 The resulting product can be further processed by any of the other processes mentioned above and below. Removal of volatile fission products means that transportation becomes slightly easier compared to spent fuel with damaged or removed cladding
 All volatile products of concern (while helium will be present in the spent fuel, there won't be any radioactive isotopes of helium) can in principle be recovered in a cold trap cooled by liquid nitrogen (temperature:  or lower). However, this requires significant amounts of cooling to counteract the effect of decay heat from radioactive volatiles like Krypton-85. Tritium will be present in the form of tritiated water, which is a solid at the temperature of liquid nitrogen.

Disadvantages
 Further processing is needed if the resulting product is to be used for re-enrichment or fabrication of MOX-fuel
Their safe recovery and storage requires further equipment.
 An oxidizing agent / reducing agent has to be used for reduction/oxidation steps whose recovery can be difficult, energy consuming or both

Volatilization in isolation
The estimated overall mass balance for 20,000 g of processed fuel with 2,000 g of cladding is:

Advantages
 Requires no chemical processes at all
 Can in theory be done "self heating" via the decay heat of sufficiently "fresh" spent fuel
 Caesium-137 has uses in food irradiation and can be used to power radioisotope thermoelectric generators.
 Can potentially recover elements like ruthenium whose ruthenate ion is particularly troublesome in PUREX and which has no isotopes significantly longer lived than a year, allowing possible recovery of the metal for use
 A "third phase recovery" can be added to the process if substances that melt but don't vaporize at the temperatures involved are drained to a container for liquid effluents and allowed to re-solidify. To avoid contamination with low-boiling products which melt at low temperatures, a melt plug could be used to open the container for liquid effluents only once a certain temperature is reached by the liquid phase.
 Strontium, which is present in the form of the particularly troublesome mid-lived fission product  is liquid above . However, Strontium oxide remains solid below  and if strontium oxide is to be recovered with other liquid effluents, it has to be reduced to the native metal before the heating step. Both Strontium and Strontium oxide form soluble Strontium hydroxide and hydrogen upon contact with water, which can be used to separate them from non-soluble parts of the spent fuel.
 As there are little to no chemical changes in the spent fuel, any chemical reprocessing methods can be used following this process

Disadvantages
 At temperatures above  the native metal form of several Actinides, including neptunium and plutonium (melting point: , are molten. This could be used to recover a liquid phase, raising proliferation concerns, given that uranium metal remains a solid until . While Neptunium and Plutonium cannot be easily separated by each other via different melting points, the different solubility in water can be used to separate them.
 If "nuclear self heating" is employed, the spent fuel with have much higher specific activity, heat production and radiation release. If an external heat source is used, significant amounts of external power are needed, which mostly go to heat the uranium.
 Heating and cooling the vacuum chamber and/or the piping and vessels to collect volatile effluents induces thermal stress. This combines with radiation damage to material and possibly neutron embrittlement if neutron sources like Californium-252 are present to a significant extent.
 In the commonly used oxide fuel, some elements will be present both as oxides and as native elements. Depending on their chemical state, they may end up in either the volatalized stream or in the residue stream. If an element is present in both states to a significant degree, separation of that element may be impossible without converting it all to one chemical state or the other
 The temperatures involved are much higher than the melting point of lead which can present issues with radiation shielding if lead is employed as a shielding material
 If filters are used to recover volatile fission products, those become low- to intermediate level waste.

Fluoride volatility 

In the fluoride volatility process, fluorine is reacted with the fuel. Fluorine is so much more reactive than even oxygen that small particles of ground oxide fuel will burst into flame when dropped into a chamber full of fluorine. This is known as flame fluorination; the heat produced helps the reaction proceed. Most of the uranium, which makes up the bulk of the fuel, is converted to uranium hexafluoride, the form of uranium used in uranium enrichment, which has a very low boiling point. Technetium, the main long-lived fission product, is also efficiently converted to its volatile hexafluoride. A few other elements also form similarly volatile hexafluorides, pentafluorides, or heptafluorides. The volatile fluorides can be separated from excess fluorine by condensation, then separated from each other by fractional distillation or selective reduction. Uranium hexafluoride and technetium hexafluoride have very similar boiling points and vapor pressures, which makes complete separation more difficult.

Many of the fission products volatilized are the same ones volatilized in non-fluorinated, higher-temperature volatilization, such as iodine, tellurium and molybdenum; notable differences are that technetium is volatilized, but caesium is not.

Some transuranium elements such as plutonium, neptunium and americium can form volatile fluorides, but these compounds are not stable when the fluorine partial pressure is decreased. Most of the plutonium and some of the uranium will initially remain in ash which drops to the bottom of the flame fluorinator. The plutonium-uranium ratio in the ash may even approximate the composition needed for fast neutron reactor fuel. Further fluorination of the ash can remove all the uranium, neptunium, and plutonium as volatile fluorides; however, some other minor actinides may not form volatile fluorides and instead remain with the alkaline fission products. Some noble metals may not form fluorides at all, but remain in metallic form; however ruthenium hexafluoride is relatively stable and volatile.

Distillation of the residue at higher temperatures can separate lower-boiling transition metal fluorides and alkali metal (Cs, Rb) fluorides from higher-boiling lanthanide and alkaline earth metal (Sr, Ba) and yttrium fluorides. The temperatures involved are much higher, but can be lowered somewhat by distilling in a vacuum. If a carrier salt like lithium fluoride or sodium fluoride is being used as a solvent, high-temperature distillation is a way to separate the carrier salt for reuse.

Molten salt reactor designs carry out fluoride volatility reprocessing continuously or at frequent intervals. The goal is to return actinides to the molten fuel mixture for eventual fission, while removing fission products that are neutron poisons, or that can be more securely stored outside the reactor core while awaiting eventual transfer to permanent storage.

Chloride volatility and solubility
Many of the elements that form volatile high-valence fluorides will also form volatile high-valence chlorides. Chlorination and distillation is another possible method for separation. Chlorination has even been proposed as a method for removing zirconium fuel cladding, instead of mechanical decladding.

Chlorides are likely to be easier than fluorides to later convert back to other compounds, such as oxides.

Chlorides remaining after volatilization may also be separated by solubility in water. Chlorides of alkaline elements like americium, curium, lanthanides, strontium, caesium are more soluble than those of uranium, neptunium, plutonium, and zirconium.

Advantages of halogen volatility
 Chlorine (and to a lesser extent fluorine) is a readily available industrial chemical that is produced in mass quantity
 Fractional distillation allows many elements to be separated from each other in a single step or iterative repetition of the same step
 Uranium will be produced directly as Uranium hexafluoride, the form used in enrichment
 Many volatile fluorides and chlorides are volatile at relatively moderate temperatures reducing thermal stress. This is especially important as the boiling point of uranium hexafluoride is below that of water, allowing to conserve energy in the separation of high boiling fission products (or their fluorides) from one another as this can take place in the absence of uranium, which makes up the bulk of the mass
 Some fluorides and chlorides melt at relatively low temperatures allowing a "liquid phase separation" if desired. Those low melting salts could be further processed by molten salt electrolysis.
 Fluorides and chlorides differ in water solubility depending on the cation. This can be used to separate them by aqueous solution. However, some fluorides violently react with water, which has to be taken into account.

Disadvantages of halogen volatility
 Many compounds of fluorine or chlorine as well as the native elements themselves are toxic, corrosive and react violently with air, water or both
 Uranium hexafluoride and Technetium hexafluoride have very similar boiling points ( and  respectively), making it hard to completely separate them from one another by distillation.
 Fractional distillation as used in petroleum refining requires large facilities and huge amounts of energy. To process tons of uranium would require similarly large facilities as processing tons of petroleum - however, unlike petroleum refineries, the entire process would have to take place inside radiation shielding and there would have to be provisions made to prevent leaks of volatile, poisonous and radioactive fluorides
 Plutonium hexafluoride boils at  this means that any facility capable of separating uranium hexafluoride from Technetium hexafluoride is capable of separating plutonium hexafluoride from either, raising proliferation concerns
 The presence of alpha emitters induces some (α,n) reactions in fluorine, producing both radioactive  and neutrons. This effect can be reduced by separating alpha emitters and fluorine as fast as feasible.
 If carbon is present in the spent fuel it'll form halogenated hydrocarbons which are extremely potent greenhouse gases, and hard to chemically decompose. Some of those are toxic as well.

Radioanalytical separations
To determine the distribution of radioactive metals for analytical purposes, Solvent Impregnated Resins (SIRs) can be used. SIRs are porous particles, which contain an extractant inside their pores. This approach avoids the liquid-liquid separation step required in conventional liquid-liquid extraction. For the preparation of SIRs for radioanalytical separations, organic Amberlite XAD-4 or XAD-7 can be used. Possible extractants are e.g. trihexyltetradecylphosphonium chloride(CYPHOS IL-101) or N,N0-dialkyl-N,N0-diphenylpyridine-2,6-dicarboxyamides
(R-PDA; R = butyl, octy I, decyl, dodecyl).

Economics 
The relative economics of reprocessing-waste disposal and interim storage-direct disposal was the focus of much debate over the first decade of the 2000s. Studies
have modeled the total fuel cycle costs of a reprocessing-recycling system based on one-time recycling of plutonium in existing thermal reactors (as opposed to the proposed breeder reactor cycle) and compare this to the total costs of an open fuel cycle with direct disposal. The range of results produced by these studies is very wide, but all agreed that under then-current economic conditions the reprocessing-recycle option is the more costly one. While the uranium market - particularly its short term fluctuations - has only a minor impact on the cost of electricity from nuclear power, long term trends in the uranium market do significantly affect the economics of nuclear reprocessing.  If uranium prices were to rise and remain consistently high, "stretching the fuel supply" via MOX fuel, breeder reactors or even the thorium fuel cycle could become more attractive.  However, if uranium prices remain low, reprocessing will remain less attractive.

If reprocessing is undertaken only to reduce the radioactivity level of spent fuel it should be taken into account that spent nuclear fuel becomes less radioactive over time. After 40 years its radioactivity drops by 99.9%, though it still takes over a thousand years for the level of radioactivity to approach that of natural uranium. However the level of transuranic elements, including plutonium-239, remains high for over 100,000 years, so if not reused as nuclear fuel, then those elements need secure disposal because of nuclear proliferation reasons as well as radiation hazard.

On 25 October 2011 a commission of the Japanese Atomic Energy Commission revealed during a meeting calculations about the costs of recycling nuclear fuel for power generation. These costs could be twice the costs of direct geological disposal of spent fuel: the cost of extracting plutonium and handling spent fuel was estimated at 1.98 to 2.14 yen per kilowatt-hour of electricity generated. Discarding the spent fuel as waste would cost only 1 to 1.35 yen per kilowatt-hour.

In July 2004 Japanese newspapers reported that the Japanese Government had estimated the costs of disposing radioactive waste, contradicting claims four months earlier that no such estimates had been made. The cost of non-reprocessing options was estimated to be between a quarter and a third ($5.5–7.9 billion) of the cost of reprocessing ($24.7 billion). At the end of the year 2011 it became clear that Masaya Yasui, who had been director of the Nuclear Power Policy Planning Division in 2004, had instructed his subordinate in April 2004 to conceal the data. The fact that the data were deliberately concealed obliged the ministry to re-investigate the case and to reconsider whether to punish the officials involved.

List of sites

See also

 Nuclear fuel cycle
 Breeder reactor
 Nuclear fusion-fission hybrid
 Spent nuclear fuel shipping cask
 Taylor Wilson's nuclear waste-fired small reactor
 Global Nuclear Energy Partnership announced February 2006

References

Notes

Further reading

 
OECD Nuclear Energy Agency, The Economics of the Nuclear Fuel Cycle, Paris, 1994
I. Hensing and W Schultz, Economic Comparison of Nuclear Fuel Cycle Options, Energiewirtschaftlichen Instituts, Cologne, 1995.
Cogema, Reprocessing-Recycling: the Industrial Stakes, presentation to the Konrad-Adenauer-Stiftung, Bonn, 9 May 1995.
OECD Nuclear Energy Agency, Plutonium Fuel: An Assessment, Paris, 1989.
National Research Council, "Nuclear Wastes: Technologies for Separation and Transmutation", National Academy Press, Washington D.C. 1996.

External links
 Processing of Used Nuclear Fuel, World Nuclear Association
PUREX Process, European Nuclear Society
Mixed Oxide Fuel (MOX) – World Nuclear Association
Disposal Options for Surplus Weapons-Usable Plutonium – Congressional Research Service Report for Congress
Brief History of Fuel Reprocessing
Annotated bibliography for reprocessing spent nuclear fuel from the Alsos Digital Library for Nuclear Issues

 
Radioactive waste